The  is a subcompact car which was produced by the Japanese automaker Daihatsu between 1998 and 2004. It effectively replaced the similar sized Charade, which was produced alongside it for a year. In international markets, with the exception of a few countries, the Storia was sold as the first-generation Daihatsu Sirion.

History
The Storia/Sirion was presented as the NCX concept car at the 1997 Tokyo Motor Show. It was confirmed there for production for 1998. It has a retro inspired design with chrome features. The name "Storia" is Italian for "story/history".

The first change to the Storia came in 2000 with new DVVT engines, including a 1300cc one, and minor restyling. It had new tail lights and reverse lights on the left and right, minor change to the front grille, as well as interior style changes and handling refinement. This updated Storia was rolled out in Japan in May 2000 and by the end of the year in the United Kingdom and Australia for the 2001 model year.

In December 2001, the Storia/Sirion/Duet was facelifted; the front grille and bumper were changed for a sportier appearance and in some markets the silver accents on the sides were removed (retained for the GTvi model in Australia). The dash and interior were redesigned, incorporating more storage spaces, easier to use controls and higher quality trim. In Australia it was released in March 2002.

The Storia was replaced by the Daihatsu Boon, which in international markets became the second generation Daihatsu Sirion.

Engines
Both were available with either a 5-speed manual or a 4-speed automatic transmission. The trim levels in the European market were the standard Sirion and the Sirion+ which added air conditioning, central locking and other equipment. They were named to the E and EL respectively in late 2000, with a new SL that had a 102 bhp 1.3 litre engine.

The Australian market only had the 989 cc model up until early 2001, when the sporty 1.3-litre model, known as the GTvi, was added to the lineup. At the time, the GTvi model had the most powerful naturally aspirated engine available in its class, developing  at 7,500 rpm. In Australia, a sequential transmission option was made available in the GTvi version only from 2002. This was an electronically controlled 4-speed automatic transmission with sequential mode activated by a dashboard switch, then gear selection by buttons on the steering wheel.

Versions
UK market exclusively received Rally versions of the Sirion: Rally 2 and Rally 4; the latter being the four-wheel drive version.

The 4Track (or just 4WD outside Japan) is a four-wheel drive version of the standard 1.3-litre model. The F-Speed is an automatic model which can be switched using a dashboard button to use push button sequential gear change on the steering wheel.

A version called the Storia X4 was released for racing in Japan. This model has a four-wheel drive layout with front and rear limited-slip differentials and is powered by a JC-DET 713 cc engine producing . The use of a slightly enlarged kei car engine on the X4 was designed to meet homologation regulations for 1-litre racing class, which imposes a displacement multiplier for turbocharged engines, while allowing for larger body that is not constrained to kei car-size regulations.

Gallery 
Storia

Sirion

Duet

References 

Storia
Cars introduced in 1998
2000s cars
Subcompact cars
Hatchbacks
Front-wheel-drive vehicles
All-wheel-drive vehicles